Pierre Bovet (born on 5 June 1878 in Grandchamp (commune of Boudry); died in Boudry on 2 December 1965) was a Swiss psychologist and pedagogue.

Bovet took up the translation of Scouting for Boys and other Scout books, to make it the first edition in French.

References

Swiss educators
Swiss psychologists
Scouting and Guiding in Switzerland
1878 births
1965 deaths